Assassinator may refer to:

The set of all Associated primes
Assassination